Thomas J. Michie House is a historic home located at Staunton, Virginia. It was built in 1847–1848, and is a three-story, three bay, Greek Revival style brick dwelling with a two-story wing. The total size is 7,100 square feet. The front facade features a one-story, flat-roofed entrance porch supported by four slender Tuscan order columns. The interior has two elaborate country Federal mantels taken from a nearby 1820 country home.  It was built by Thomas J. Michie, who represented Augusta County in the Virginia House of Delegates and may be of the same family that built Michie's Tavern in Charlottesville, Virginia as well as Michie Stadium at West Point Military Academy.  It was later the home of jurist Allen Caperton Braxton (1862-1914) and Henry W. Holt (1864-1947) who was the Chief Justice of the Virginia Supreme Court.

It was added to the National Register of Historic Places in 1982. It is located in the Gospel Hill Historic District.

References

Houses on the National Register of Historic Places in Virginia
Greek Revival houses in Virginia
Houses completed in 1848
Houses in Staunton, Virginia
National Register of Historic Places in Staunton, Virginia
Individually listed contributing properties to historic districts on the National Register in Virginia
Braxton family of Virginia
Caperton family of Virginia and West Virginia